The 2006 Under 21 Rugby World Championship was played in the Auvergne region of France throughout June 2006. The final was played between South Africa and France at the Stade Marcel-Michelin in Clermont-Ferrand, which saw France win 24–13.

Participants

Results

Pool stages
 9 June England 34–8 Fiji Stade Darragon, Vichy
 9 June Italy 16–75 New Zealand Stade Émile Pons, Riom
 9 June Wales 73–25 Georgia Stade au Complexe du Mas, Issoire
 9 June Ireland 8–26 France Stade au Complexe du Mas, Issoire
 9 June Australia	18–14 Scotland Stade Darragon, Vichy
 9 June South Africa 20–16 Argentina Stade Émile Pons, Riom
 13 June Ireland	22–26 Argentina	 Stade Couturier, Cournon d'Auvergne
 13 June Australia 43–20 Fiji Stade Antonin Chastel, Thiers
 13 June England	14–29 New Zealand	Stade Darragon, Vichy
 13 June South Africa	102–17 Georgia	Stade Antonin Chastel, Thiers
 13 June Wales 3–32 France Stade Couturier, Cournon d'Auvergne
 13 June Italy 10–26 Scotland Stade Darragon, Vichy
 17 June Italy 17–43 Fiji Stade Darragon, Vichy
 17 June Wales 10–13	Argentina	Stade Émile Pons, Riom
 17 June Ireland	47–0	Georgia Stade au Complexe du Mas, Issoire
 17 June Australia 21–17 New Zealand Stade Darragon, Vichy
 17 June England	31–12 Scotland Stade Émile Pons, Riom
 17 June South Africa 14–10	France Stade au Complexe du Mas, Issoire

Results after pool games

Second round

10th v 11th
 21 June Fiji 33–12 Italy Stade au Complexe du Mas, Issoire

9th v 12th
 21 June Scotland 46–14 Georgia Stade au Complexe du Mas, Issoire

6th v 7th
 21 June Argentina 20–42 Ireland	Stade Darragon, Vichy

5th v 8th
 21 June England	13–11 Wales Stade Darragon, Vichy

Semi-finals

2nd v 3rd
 21 June Australia 17–32 France Stade Marcel-Michelin, Clermont-Ferrand

1st v 4th
 21 June South Africa	40–23 New Zealand Stade Marcel-Michelin, Clermont-Ferrand

Play-offs

11th place play-off
 25 June Italy 12–9 Georgia Stade Antonin Chastel, Thiers

9th place play-off
 25 June Fiji	 21–19 Scotland Stade Antonin Chastel, Thiers

7th place play-off
 25 June Argentina 28–12 Wales Stade Couturier, Cournon d'Auvergne

5th place play-off
 25 June Ireland 8–32 England Stade Couturier, Cournon d'Auvergne

Finals

3rd place play-off
 25 June New Zealand 39–36 Australia Stade Marcel-Michelin, Clermont-Ferrand

Championship final
 25 June South Africa 13–24 France Stade Marcel-Michelin, Clermont-Ferrand

External links
IRB21.com
IRB.com

2006
2006 rugby union tournaments for national teams
International rugby union competitions hosted by France
2005–06 in French rugby union
2006 in youth sport